Alireza Sarlak is an Iranian freestyle wrestler. He won the silver medal in the men's 57 kg event at the 2021 World Wrestling Championships held in Oslo, Norway.

In 2021, he also won the silver medal in the 57 kg event at the Asian Wrestling Championships held in Almaty, Kazakhstan. He competed in the 57kg event at the 2022 World Wrestling Championships held in Belgrade, Serbia.

References

External links 
 

Living people
1997 births
Iranian male sport wrestlers
World Wrestling Championships medalists
Asian Wrestling Championships medalists
21st-century Iranian people